Ranjith Balakrishnan  (born 5 September 1964) is an Indian film director, screenwriter, lyricist, producer, and actor who works in Malayalam cinema. Ranjith made his directorial debut in 2001 with Ravanaprabhu, the sequel to Devaasuram. His films Thirakkatha and Indian Rupee won the National Film Award for Best Feature Film in Malayalam in 2008 and 2011 respectively. He is also the current chairman of Kerala State Chalachitra Academy.

Early life
Ranjith was born in Balussery in Kozhikode, Kerala. He graduated from the School of Drama and Fine Arts, Thrissur, in 1985.

Career

1987 to 1992: Early career
Ranjith's entry into Mollywood was accidental, he was inspired by his friend, the late film producer and director Alex I. Kadavil, in whose residence he had stayed for his debut in the film industry. In 1987, he made his debut as a writer in Oru Maymasa Pulariyil, produced by Alex I. Kadavil and directed by V. R. Gopinath. In 1988, Ranjith made his formal entry into the film world by writing the story for Orkkapurathu, an adventure film directed by Kamal, with Mohanlal in the lead role. The immediate success of Orkkapurathu brought Ranjith several opportunities to work in films. In the late 1980s and early 1990s, Ranjith wrote scripts for several small budget films, mainly for Kamal, including Peruvannapurathe Visheshangal (1989), Pradeshika Varthakal (1989) and Pookkalam Varavayi (1991).

Another director with whom Ranjith worked during this period was Viji Thampi. This team released Witness (1988), Nanma Niranjavan Sreenivasan (1990), Nagarangalil Chennu Raparkam (1989) and Kaalalpada (1990), all with Jayaram in the lead role. In 1992, he wrote Neelagiri for I. V. Sasi, which underperformed at the box office. This was followed by Johnnie Walker, directed by Jayaraj, which was noted for its different filmmaking style and was a commercial success at the box office.

1993 to 2000: Breakthrough 
1993 was significant in Ranjith's career: Devasuram, his film based on the life of his father-figure, Mullassery Rajagopal, turned out to be a huge box office hit. With Mohanlal in the lead and directed by I.V. Sasi, Devasuram was both critically and commercially acclaimed; Mohanlal's performance was lauded and it opened a new genre of feudal stories in Malayalam cinema. Within two months of the release of Devasuram, Ranjith's next movie, Maya Mayuram (directed by Sibi Malayil and again starring Mohanlal) was released, but was not as successful. According to Ranjith, Maya Mayuram is one of his best films and its failure affected him greatly. Ranjith mentioned in an interview that several directors passed on the opportunity to make Maya Mayuram, and it was Mohanlal who convinced Sibi Malayil to get involved.

After writing Yadavam (directed by Jomon and starring Suresh Gopi), Ranjith worked with Shaji Kailas for Rudraksham, again starring Suresh Gopi, who was at the peak of his career. This film generated significant hype in the market as Shaji Kailas-Suresh Gopi was a hot selling team at the time, but the loose script and clichéd humorless dialogues led to Rudraksham becoming a flop. His next piece of work, Rajaputhran, directed by Shajun Karyal, again with Suresh Gopi in the lead, became a superhit.

In 1997, Ranjith teamed up again with Shaji Kailas for Asuravamsham, starring Manoj K Jayan and Biju Menon; the film yielded an average commercial response. Towards the end of 1997, Ranjith penned Aaraam Thampuran, which went to become one of the biggest hits of his career. This film was also a turning point in the career of Mohanlal, and with it Ranjith gained a reputation as a commercially viable scriptwriter. Then came Kaikudanna Nilavu, in 1998, directed by Kamal, starring Jayaram, yet another average grosser. In 1998 Ranjith scripted Summer in Bethlehem, directed by Sibi Malayil, starring Suresh Gopi and Jayaram, a super hit. In 1999, Ranjith and Shaji Kailas produced the film Ustaad, directed by Sibi Malayil, starring Mohanlal.

The year 2000 began with the release of Narasimham, directed by Shaji Kailas. With Mohanlal playing the lead role, this film became one of the biggest hits ever in the history of Malayalam cinema at the time. Yet again in 2000, together with  Director Shaji, Ranjith repeated history: his Onam release Valliettan starring Mammooty was a commercial success. This was his last script for Shaji Kailas and with this film Ranjith became the most successful scriptwriter of the time.

2001 to 2009: Directorial debut and further success 
In 2001, Ranjith made his directorial debut with Ravanaprabhu, the sequel to Devasuram. With Mohanlal appearing in dual roles as father and son, this film turned out to be another blockbuster. In 2002 Ranjith came back with another blockbuster, Nandanam, starring Navya Nair and a new face, Prithviraj Sukumaran. Ranjith produced this film along with his friend, actor Siddique. Nandanam, revolving around an innocent girl, her love for Lord Sri Krishna and her beau, was an entirely different and unexpected theme from Ranjith at the time. Despite the film not having a big star cast, fights, or punchy dialogues and being shelved after some pre-production activities it became a hit.

In 2003 Ranjith directed Mizhi Randilum, starring Dileep and Kavya Madhavan, another family drama, which failed to impress the masses, but was critically acclaimed. In the same year Ranjith scripted Ammakilikood, directed by Padmakumar with Prithviraj in the lead role, which also got the cold shoulder from the public. In 2004 Ranjith teamed up with Mammooty for Black, which was a complete commercial entertainer targeting the fans of Mammootty. Chandrolsavam, starring Mohanlal, followed in 2005. Ranjith believes that it was not a bad film. He said, "Mohanlal fans expected too much. I don't think it was a bad film. Many who watched it on DVD called to say they were surprised it did not do well. Fans come in with pre-conceived notions on how the actor will be in the movie and the kind of story it will be, hence they could not grasp the poetic element in the film."

In 2006, he scripted and directed Prajapathi, starring Mammootty, was also blasted by critics, and was another disastrous movie. His next venture was an offbeat film Kaiyoppu. Though a flop at the box office, Kaiyoppu brought critical appreciation from far corners and that compelled Ranjith to work with plots and themes without any commercial ingredients. Notably, its lead actor Mammootty received no payment to act in the film as the script impressed him so much.

In 2007, Ranjith teamed up with Joshiy for the big budget film Nasrani starring Mammootty. His next directorial feature was the musical-comedy Rock & Roll, starring Mohanlal. In 2008 Ranjith directed Thirakkatha, based on actress Srividya's life, which won the National Award for the Best Malayalam Feature Film. Starring Anoop Menon and Priyamani, the movie featured Prithviraj and Samvrutha Sunil in important supporting roles. The movie was able to bring out the best in the actors. In 2009 Ranjith directed and wrote the script for Paleri Manikyam: Oru Pathira Kolapathakathinte Katha, which was critically acclaimed. Ranjith also introduced about thirty Malayalam stage artists through this film. In the same year he came up with another unique creation, Kerala Cafe — a fusion of ten different short films by ten directors. The different segments in the movie were conceived and connected based on the concept of Yatra, or journey.

2010 onwards
In 2010 Ranjith wrote the story for the film Penpattanam, directed by V. M. Vinu. He then scripted and directed, Pranchiyettan and the Saint, starring Mammootty, which was also widely accepted by movie fans and the people of Kerala. It became the most popular film of the year and was also a commercial success. Pranchiyettan and the Saint is now considered one of the best comedy films in Malayalam cinema and has over the years attained a cult status. During this time, Ranjith also received a highly coveted appointment as the School Director for Cochin Media School. He also appeared as judge in "Mammootty the Best Actor Award – II", an acting talent-hunt reality show aired on the television channel Asianet. In 2011, Ranjith scripted and directed a critically acclaimed satirical film Indian Rupee starring Prithviraj, which was well received by the critics and also a commercial success. His next film, Spirit, primarily focused on the increasing habits of alcoholism in Kerala. Starring Mohanlal in the lead role, the film was critically acclaimed and a box office success. He then produced and scripted for G. S. Vijayan's Mammootty-starring Bavuttiyude Namathil in 2012, which was an average at the box office. His next film with Mammootty, Kadal Kadannoru Mathukkutty, underperformed at the box office.

Njaan, based on the novel K T N Kottoor: Ezhuthum Jeevithavum by T P Rajeevan and featuring Dulquer Salmaan in the lead role, was released on 19 September 2014. He also produced Munnariyippu starring Mammootty in the lead role. The film became one of the highest grossers of the year. In 2015 he directed Loham, starring Mohanlal, which received mixed reactions from critics.

Filmography

Awards
National Film Awards:
 2012: Best Film on Social Issues – Spirit
 2011: Best Feature Film in Malayalam – Indian Rupee
 2008: Best Feature Film in Malayalam – Thirakkatha

Kerala State Film Awards:
 2014: Kerala State Film Award for Best Screenplay(Adapted) – Njaan
 2011: Kerala State Film Award for Best Film – Indian Rupee
 2010: Kerala State Film Award for Best Film - Pranchiyettan and The Saint
 2009: Kerala State Film Award for Best Film – Paleri Manikyam: Oru Pathirakolapathakathinte Katha
 2001: Kerala State Film Award for Best Film with Popular Appeal and Aesthetic Value – Ravanaprabhu

Kerala Film Critics Awards
 2010: Kerala Film Critics Award for Best Film – Pranchiyettan and the Saint
 2010: Kerala Film Critics Award for Best Director – Pranchiyettan and the Saint
 2010: Kerala Film Critics Award for Best Script – Pranchiyettan and the Saint
 2009: Kerala Film Critics Award for Second Best Film – Paleri Manikyam: Oru Pathirakolapathakathinte Katha
 2008: Kerala Film Critics Award for Best Film – Thirakkatha
 2008: Kerala Film Critics Award for Second Best Actor – Gulmohar
 2007: Kerala Film Critics Award for Second Best Film – Kaiyoppu
 2003: Kerala Film Critics Award for Second Best Film – Mizhi Randilum
 2002: Kerala Film Critics Award for Best Director – Nandanam
 2002: Kerala Film Critics Award for Best Film – Nandanam

Asianet Film Awards
 2012: Asianet Film Award for Best Director – Spirit
 2011: Asianet Film Award for Best Director – Indian Rupee
 2010: Asianet Film Award for Best Film – Pranchiyettan and the Saint
 2009: Asianet Film Award for Best Director – Paleri Manikyam: Oru Pathirakolapathakathinte Katha
 2003: Asianet Film Award for Best Script Writer – Mizhi Randilum
 2002: Asianet Film Award for Best Film – Nandanam

Filmfare Awards South
 2014: Best Film – Munnariyippu
 2010: Best Director – Pranchiyettan & the Saint
 2010: Best Film – Pranchiyettan & the Saint
 2008: Best Director – Thirakkatha
 2008: Best Film – Thirakkatha

Other Awards:
 2011: Vayalar Ramavarma Chalachitra Television Award and The Kochi Times Film Award for Best Film – Indian Rupee
 2010: Nana Film Awards for the Best Film – Pranchiyettan & the Saint
 2010: Nana Film Awards for the Best Director – Pranchiyettan & the Saint
 2010: Vanitha Film Awards for the Best Film – Pranchiyettan & the Saint
 2010: Vanitha Film Awards for the Best Director – Pranchiyettan & the Saint
 2010: Vanitha Film Awards for the Best Script – Pranchiyettan & the Saint
 2010: Kairali film Awards for the Best Film – Pranchiyettan & the Saint
 2010: Kairali film Awards for the Best Director – Pranchiyettan & the Saint
 2010: Vanitha Film Awards for Best Director – Paleri Manikyam: Oru Pathirakolapathakathinte Katha
 2010: Mathrubhumi – Amrita TV Film Awards for Best Director – Paleri Manikyam: Oru Pathirakolapathakathinte Katha
 2008: Mathrubhumi – Amrita TV Film Awards for Best Film – Thirakkatha
 2008: Mathrubhumi – Amrita TV Film Awards for Best Director – Thirakkatha
 2008: Padmarajan Award – Thirakkatha
 2005: Bharathan Memorial Award
 2002: Ramu Kariat Award – Nandanam

References

External links
 
 'Cinema of Malayalam' profile
 School of Media

1964 births
Malayalam film directors
Living people
Male actors from Kozhikode
Kerala State Film Award winners
Malayalam screenwriters
Male actors in Malayalam cinema
Filmfare Awards South winners
Malayalam film producers
Indian male film actors
Film producers from Kerala
20th-century Indian film directors
21st-century Indian film directors
Film directors from Kerala
20th-century Indian male actors
21st-century Indian male actors
20th-century Indian dramatists and playwrights
21st-century Indian dramatists and playwrights
Writers from Kozhikode
Screenwriters from Kerala
Directors who won the Best Film on Other Social Issues National Film Award